Orville (1799–1826) was a British Thoroughbred racehorse and sire. In a racing career which lasted from August 1801 until October 1807 the horse ran thirty-four times and won twenty races. In his early career he was based in Yorkshire and won the classic St Leger Stakes at Doncaster Racecourse as a three-year-old in 1802.

He had some success in the next two seasons before being sold to the Prince of Wales and being moved to campaign in the south of England. In his last three seasons he won fifteen races at long distances, becoming particularly effective over Newmarket's four mile Beacon Course, and winning several match races against the leading stayers of the day. After his racing career ended he became a highly successful breeding stallion.

Background
Orville was a bay horse with a white star bred by his owner William Fitzwilliam, 4th Earl Fitzwilliam. He was from the first crop of foals sired by the St Leger winner Beningbrough, who at the time was based at Shipton in Yorkshire. Beningbrough went on to sire the Oaks Stakes winner Briseis and the Doncaster Cup winner Scud, who in turn sired The Derby winners Sailor and Sam. Orville's dam Evelina, also bred by Fitzwilliam, was a half-sister of the St Leger winner Pewett, and went on to produce the successful stallions Cervantes and Paulowitz.

Racing career

1801: two-year-old season

Until 1913 there was no requirement for British racehorses to have official names (two-year-olds were allowed to race unnamed until 1946). The colt who became known as Orville raced unnamed in 1801, being described on his debut as "Ld Fitzwilliam's b.c. by Beningbrough, out of Evelina". At York Racecourse in August, the colt finished fourth of the five runners in a Sweepstakes. On 23 September Lord Fitzwilliam's colt recorded his first success when he won a race over one mile at Doncaster Racecourse in which he started the 4/5 favourite against four opponents.

1802: three-year-old season
Orville made his first appearance as a three-year-old at York on 25 August. In a Sweepstakes over a distance of two miles he finished second to Mr Wardell's colt Sir John. Three days later, over the same course and distance he finished second of the four runners in another Sweepstakes, the race being won by the favourite, a colt named Peter.

A month later, Orville was one of seven colts to contest the St Leger Stakes at Doncaster Racecourse. He started at odds of 5/1 with Christopher Wilson's unnamed colt by Young Eclipse being made the 4/5 favourite. Orville's stable companion Sparrowhawk was the second choice in the betting at 5/2. Orville won the race from Pipylin, with Sparrowhawk in third place. Two days later, Orville ran in the weight-for-age Doncaster Cup over a distance of four miles. He finished second of the eight runners behind the four-year-old Alonzo.

1803: four-year-old season
Orville failed to win in three starts in 1803. At York in May he finished second to Lennox in a two-mile Sweepstakes. At the same course in August he finished second to Duxbury in a four-mile race and second again when beaten by Mr Mellish's horse Stockton four days later.

1804: five-year-old season
Orville began his five-year-old season by winning a two-mile Sweepstakes at York on 29 May. He returned to York in August when he finished last of the five runners behind Haphazard in a four-mile subscription race and second to R Garfoth's horse by Traveller in a similar event two days later. In September at Doncaster Orville won the two mile Free Handicap Sweepstakes and a four-mile match race against Mr Mellish's horse Stockton. In October, Orville was sent south to run at Newmarket where he finished second to Eleanor in a race over the four mile Beacon Course.

1805: six-year-old season

Before the start of the 1805 season, Orville was sold and entered into the ownership of the Prince of Wales. Following a dispute with the Jockey Club in 1791, the Prince's horses did not run at Newmarket: when Orville appeared at the course he was temporarily transferred to the ownership of Delme Radcliffe. On 27 July Orville ran his first race as a six-year-old in the four mile Somerset Stakes at Brighton Racecourse. He finished fourth but was declared the winner after the first three finishers were disqualified for "not having run the proper Course". Three days later, at the same course, Orville won the Brighton Gold Cup, beating Houghton Lass and two others. The cup for this race had been donated by the Prince of Wales, who was therefore the winner of his own trophy. At Lewes in August, Orville won a King's Plate in two four-mile heats, and a subscription race in which he defeated Walton. On 31 October, Orville again failed to show his best form at Newmarket, where he finished unplaced in a handicap race over the two mile "Ditch-In" course.

1806: seven-year-old season
Orville began his sixth season by beating the St Leger winner Quiz over the Beacon Course at Newmarket in May. In the summer he finished third in the Somerset Stakes and then claimed two prizes at Lewes without having to race: Houghton Lass was scratched from a scheduled match race against Orville who also walked over in a Sweepstakes. Orville completed his season with three races at Newmarket in October. He defeated the Duke of Grafton's mare Parasol and the St Leger winner Staveley over the Beacon Course and then stepped down in distance to win a 200 guinea match against Mr Mellish's horse Sancho (another St Leger winner) over the Abington mile. On the same day as his match with Sancho he was then beaten by the five-year-old Bustard, conceding six pounds, in a four-mile subscription race.

1807: eight-year-old season
Orville began his final season at Newmarket in March where he finished fourth in the Oatlands Stakes, a handicap race in which he carried top weight of 132 pounds. At the next meeting in April he won a Free Handicap Sweepstakes over the Beacon Course, conceding eight pounds to the Oaks winner Pelisse. In August Orville walked over for the Somerset Stakes at Brighton and then contested three events at Lewes. He won a match against Pelisse, a Sweepstakes, beating Cerberus and the Ladies' Plate in which he conceded forty-one pounds to a three-year-old colt named Brighton. Orville ended his career at Newmarket in autumn with two further wins beating Canopus in a subscription race over the Beacon Course on 28 September and Parasol in a similar event on 9 October.

Stud record

Orville retired from racing to become a breeding stallion. He was initially based at Six Mile Bottom near Newmarket where he stood at a fee of 10 guineas, with a half-guinea for the groom. He moved to Newmarket the following year and was then sent north to stand in Yorkshire from 1810.

Orville was an immediate success at stud, siring the Derby winner Octavius from his first crop of foals. His other classic winners were Charlotte, Zoe, Ebor and Emilius. The last-named became a successful stallion, as did Andrew, the sire of Cadland, Pollio, the sire of Pussy, and Muley, the sire of Margrave, Vespa and Little Wonder. Orville was also the broodmare sire of the St Leger winners Birmingham and Jerry and the Oaks winners Songstress and Miss Letty. Orville was the Leading sire in Great Britain and Ireland in 1817 when his offspring won 41 races and £6,439 and again in 1823 with 22 races and £9,978.

Orville was euthanised in November 1826.

Pedigree

Orville was inbred 3 × 3 to Herod, meaning that this stallion appears twice in the third generation of his pedigree.

Weblinks

References

1799 racehorse births
1826 racehorse deaths
Racehorses bred in the United Kingdom
Racehorses trained in the United Kingdom
Thoroughbred family 8-a
St Leger winners